(real name , née ), born May 10, 1961, is a Japanese enka singer. She is signed onto Sony Music Japan. Born in Kakunodate, Akita, Fuji graduated from Akita Prefectural Kakunodate South High School.

Enka career 
Fuji made her enka debut on September 21, 1989.

Releases (solo)

Hit songs
 Onna, 1990
 Ameyo Zake, 1991
 Kokoro Zake, 1992
 Murasaki Ujō, 1993
 Hana no Waltz, 1994
 Miren, 1995
 Utakata no Koi, 1998
 Yuki shin shin, 1998

Audio releases
 Ayako Fuji: Best Of Best, June 20, 2001
 Ayako Fuji zenkyokushu, November 11, 2001
 Koyoi zake, May 22, 2002
 Ryuhyoukoiuta, August 28, 2002
 Saigetsu, October 23, 2002
 Yorisoibashi, March 26, 2003
 Manjushaka, September 18, 2003
 Ayako Fuji Zenkyoku Shu, November 19, 2003
 Hanabira Bojo, February 18, 2004
 Yuki Koya, September 29, 2004
 Ayako Fuji Saishin Hit Zenkyokusyu, November 11, 2004
 Minato Komoriuta, May 18, 2005
 Fuji Ayako Saishin Hit Zenkyokushu'06, November 11, 2005
 Yoimachigusa, March 3, 2006
 Shizukana Yume [Limited Release], April 5, 2006
 Ayako Fuji Hit Kyoku Zenshu '07, November 8, 2006

Video releases
 Debut 10th Anniversary Recital - Hana Yurete 10 Nen, October 21, 1998
 Ayako Fuji Super Hit Video Vol.1, January 24, 2001
 Tokusen DVD Single - Minato Komoriuta, August 24, 2005

Television

NHK Kayō Concert 「NHK歌謡コンサート」 
Kōhaku Uta Gassen (15 appearances as of 57th event) 
 43rd 1992, Kokoro Zake
 44th 1993, Murasaki Ujō
 45th 1994, Hana no Waltz
 46th 1995, Miren
 47th 1996, Beni
 48th 1997, Utakata no Koi
 49th 1998, Yuki Shinshin
 50th 1999, Onna no Magokoro
 51st 2000, Futari Hana
 52nd 2001, Futari no Kizuna
 53rd 2002, Ryuhyoukoiuta
 54th 2003, Manjushaka
 55th 2004, Yuki Arano
 56th 2005, Murasaki Ujō
 57th 2006, Yuki Shinshin

See also 
 Natsuko Godai, born in the same year and also signed to Sony Music Direct

References 

Enka singers
Sony Music Entertainment Japan artists
Living people
1961 births
Musicians from Akita Prefecture